Pentila torrida is a butterfly in the family Lycaenidae. It is found in Gabon, the Republic of the Congo and Bas-Fleuve in the Democratic Republic of the Congo .

References

Butterflies described in 1887
Poritiinae
Butterflies of Africa
Taxa named by William Forsell Kirby